Edward Russell Meekins Jr. (June 29, 1949 – September 13, 2020) was an American politician who served four terms as a Democratic member of the Alaska House of Representatives from 1973 to 1974 and from 1977 to 1982. He went to Oregon State University, University of Oregon, and Anchorage Community College majoring in economics, history, and political science. Meekins worked for Alaska Water Refining Company and was the vice-president of the company. His father Russ Meekins Sr. and sister Susan Sullivan also served in that body. Meekins died at his home in Sandwich, Massachusetts. He was the father of figure skater Drew Meekins.

References

1949 births
2020 deaths
Democratic Party members of the Alaska House of Representatives
Politicians from Anchorage, Alaska
Businesspeople from Anchorage, Alaska
People from Sandwich, Massachusetts
Oregon State University alumni
University of Oregon alumni
University of Alaska Anchorage alumni